Mohamed Sydney Sylla (born 27 December 1996) is a Burkinabe footballer.

International career

International goals
Scores and results list Burkina Faso's goal tally first.

References

External links 
 

1996 births
Living people
Association football midfielders
Burkinabé footballers
Burkina Faso international footballers
African Games silver medalists for Burkina Faso
African Games medalists in football
Salitas FC players
Competitors at the 2015 African Games
21st-century Burkinabé people
Burkina Faso A' international footballers
2018 African Nations Championship players